Fazanerija City Stadium is a multi-use stadium in Murska Sobota, Slovenia. It is currently used mostly for football matches and is the home ground of NŠ Mura. The stadium was built in 1936 and has a capacity of 4,506 seats. With the standing area included, the total capacity of the stadium is around 4,700.

History
In 1934, the Municipality of Murska Sobota contacted the architect Franc Novak and asked him to make plans for the stadium. The first pitch was completed by 1936. The stadium was officially opened on 28 June 1936, and became the home ground of the local football team SK Mura. Initially, the stadium was called Stadion Viteškega Kralja Aleksandra I. Zedinitelja, in honour of Alexander I of Yugoslavia. The cost of building the stadium was 160,000 Yugoslav dinar.

In the early 1980s, the stadium was expanded with the construction of a new main stand. A decade later, in 1994, two additional stands were built, located in the northern and southern parts of the stadium. In 2001, all stands were covered with a roof.

In 2017, the locker rooms underwent a complete reconstruction in accordance with UEFA standards. In 2019, Fazanerija received floodlights. In 2019 and 2020, the stadium underwent further renovations and adjustments, including new seats, renovation of the stand for visiting fans, renovation of the roof, renovation of the camera tower and the new press center.

Events
The stadium is mainly used for football and is the home ground of NŠ Mura. Previously, the stadium was used by NK Mura and ND Mura 05, the clubs that were dissolved in 2005 and 2013, respectively. The stadium hosted three matches of the Slovenian national team. Fazanerija is also occasionally used as a venue for Slovenian youth teams and the Slovenian women's national team.

See also
List of football stadiums in Slovenia

References

External links
Mestni stadion Fazanerija at Football Stadiums of Slovenia

Football venues in Slovenia
Stadium
Murska Sobota
Multi-purpose stadiums in Slovenia
Sports venues completed in 1936
1936 establishments in Slovenia
Stadium